Nordstrand or Nordstranda is a little village area in Giske Municipality in Møre og Romsdal county, Norway.  The village is located on the east side of the island of Valderøya. The administrative center of Giske Municipality is Valderhaugstrand, an area on the south side of the island that (according to Statistics Norway) is part of the Nordstrand urban area.

References

Villages in Møre og Romsdal
Giske